The Zirve University (Turkish Zirve Üniversitesi)  was a private university established in 2009, located in Gaziantep, southeastern Anatolia, Turkey. The university had eight faculties. It was a mix-oriented (research and education) institution. English language was the primary medium of teaching in College of Engineering, College of Architecture and Design, and College of Economics and Administrative Sciences. Turkish language was the primary medium of teaching for the rest of colleges while several courses were also offered in English. The university had total enrollment of more than 8,000 undergraduate and graduate students in 2016.

Around 20% of the students were offered tuition-free education while another 20% were offered 50% tuition scholarship based on their success at National University Entrance Exam done by ÖSYM. The university also offered full scholarships for those who has significant sport excellence and/or national license of sport. The university was listed among the top 50  most entrepreneur and innovator university list by TUBITAK. On 23 July 2016, the university was forced to close by the Turkish government. Zirve University facilities were transferred to Gaziantep University.

Legal Status
The establishment of the university was supported by President Abdullah Gül,  Prime Minister Recep Tayyip Erdoğan,  Ministers: Fatma Şahin, Mehmet Şimşek, Ali Babacan, Bülent Arınç, Egemen Bağış, Hüseyin Çelik, Kürşad Tüzmen, Zafer Çağlayan, Mehmet Ali Şahin, Taner Yıldız, Beşir Atalay, Vecdi Gönül, Cemil Çiçek, Binali Yıldırım, Ertuğrul Günay, Veysel Eroğlu, Faruk Çelik, Murat Başeskioğlu, Cevdet Yılmaz, Nimet Çubukçu, Kemal Unakıtan, Faruk Nafiz Özak, Recep Akdağ, Mehmet Aydın, Nazım Ekren.

Faculties

Faculty of Architecture and Design
Faculty of Communication
Faculty of Engineering
Faculty of Economics and Administrative Sciences
Faculty of Education
Faculty of Law
Faculty of Health Sciences
Faculty of Medicine
Faculty of Dentistry
School of Foreign Languages
Vocational School
Institute of Health Sciences
Institute of Social Sciences
Institute of Science

Research Centers
Middle East Strategic Research Center
Nanotechnology Research and Application Center
Food and Agriculture Center
Continuing Education Center
Physiotherapy and rehabilitation Center
Turkish Language Center
Marine Engineering Simulation Center

References

3. http://www.resmigazete.gov.tr/main.aspx?home=http://www.resmigazete.gov.tr/eskiler/2009/02/20090228m1.htm&main=http://www.resmigazete.gov.tr/eskiler/2009/02/20090228m1.htm

Universities and colleges in Turkey
Buildings and structures in Gaziantep
Private universities and colleges in Turkey
Educational institutions established in 2009
Defunct universities and colleges in Turkey
2009 establishments in Turkey